Bad Influence is a 1990 American psychological thriller film directed by Curtis Hanson starring Rob Lowe and James Spader. In this noirish film, Spader plays a yuppie who meets a mysterious stranger (Lowe) who encourages him to explore his dark side. Bad Influence was the first original screenplay for which David Koepp received a sole screenplay credit. The film's villain is loosely based on a real person, a nomadic surfer who befriended executive producer Morrie Eisenman.

Plot

A  man leaves a naked woman sleeping as he disappears into the city, throwing away a bag of things to cover his tracks.

Michael Boll, a shy, socially awkward doormat, finds important work data missing. He knows that Patterson, his nemesis at work, has somehow hidden them but can't prove it, let alone bring himself to accuse the man. Frustrated, he hides in his office - only to be confronted by his fiancée Ruth, whose prattling about their upcoming wedding serves to create further anxiety for Michael. He goes to a bar at the beach and buys a drink for a woman who has lost her wallet. Her abusive boyfriend appears and assaults Michael. Suddenly, a man appears, breaks a beer bottle and defends Michael, menacing the thug until he leaves. Michael turns to thank his benefactor, but the man has disappeared.

At home, Michael’s older brother Pismo borrows money - a frequent occurrence he blames on being unable to get anywhere because of a drug conviction.

Michael goes for a nighttime jog and sees the mysterious man from the bar on the pier. He introduces himself as Alex. They go out for drinks and Alex tells Michael he needs to get the best of Patterson. At work, he does just that and feels exhilarated.

Over a short period of time, Alex introduces Michael to a life of hedonism, aggression and anarchy. He shows Ruth a video of Michael having sex with Claire to break up the engagement Michael told him he didn’t want, creates a distance between Michael and his brother, involves him in an armed robbery and drug-fueled crime spree, ending with an assault on Patterson, though Michael is too drunk and drugged to know what what happened.

Eventually, Michael comes to his senses when he learns at work about the assault. He confronts Alex, who tells him in detail about what happened; Michael tells him he’s finished with this toxic relationship.

At work, Michael wins the promotion he’s been dreaming of because Patterson has withdrawn. Michael feels too guilty to enjoy his success.

Alex takes it upon himself to convince Michael to reconsider his decision - one way or another. Michael returns to an emptied apartment and realizes Alex is behind it. When he finds him and Alex takes credit for the promotion, Michael tells him to keep the stuff and consider them even.

Alex begins wreaking havoc on Michael’s life. He makes a video of himself murdering Claire off-camera with Michael’s golf club and leaves her body in his apartment. Alex beats Michael and leaves him, taking the tape of the murder. Michael is trapped, unable to go to the police. He enlists his brother’s help to get rid of the body in the La Brea Tar Pits.

Michael’s secretary transfers to another department because she is upset by his changed personality. Claire's body is found by police and Michael finds his golf club in his office - a message from Alex. Michael enlists Pismo’s help again - this time to find Alex and eliminate the problem.

Michael sets up Alex: he sends Pismo to the secret floating sex party to follow Alex. Pismo grabs a beer bottle with Alex’s DNA and a bag with the driver's license of the girl Alex is currently staying with. Alex sees him and follows him out of the club. Alex attacks Pismo, but Michael saves him, and Pismo gives him the girl's address. Michael has obtained a gun, lent to him by a security guard from work, and is about to leave to murder Alex when Pismo notices that Alex has rigged the car to blow up. They fix it and Michael changes his mind about killing Alex.

At the girl's apartment, Alex has sex with two women. He prepares to disappear the way he did before. After he grabs a plastic bag with Michael’s bloody jacket, Michael appears and holds a knife to his throat. Alex admits he was going to plant it at Michael’s apartment. They struggle. Alex prepares to kill Michael, who escapes, running down the pier. Alex traps him at the end of the pier and Michael grabs the gun which he has planted there; it’s a trap for Alex. He preens and tells Michael his belief that humanity is inherently bad, and admits to murdering Claire and beating up Patterson while Michael was unconscious. Michael calls out to Pismo, who has recorded the entire confession with a video camera. Pismo stumbles, distracting Michael, and Alex lunges at him. Michael shoots in self-defense and Alex falls into the water.

Pismo calls the police, who appear on the pier, and Michael walks out to meet them with the evidence.

Cast
Rob Lowe as Alex
James Spader as Michael Boll
Lisa Zane as Claire
Christian Clemenson as Pismo Boll
Marcia Cross as Ruth Fielding
Kathleen Wilhoite as Leslie 
Grand L. Bush as Bartender
David Duchovny as Club Goer with Glasses
Perri Lister as Claire's Friend
Michael Kristick as Bouncer
Bianca Rossini as Bumped Woman
John de Lancie as Howard
Warren Stanhope as Banker
Lilyan Chauvin as Art Gallery Patron
Rosalyn Landor as Britt
Tony Maggio as Patterson
Palmer Lee Todd as Naked Woman
Sunny Smith as Waitress
Susan Lee Hoffman as Karen, Woman in Bar
Jeff Kaake as Willie, Man in Bar

Production
The film is based on an original script by David Koepp who had previously made just one movie, Apartment Zero. The script launched Koepp's career.

Director Curtis Hanson stated that the film bears similarities to his earlier movies, The Silent Partner and The Bedroom Window. He said all are about a "character who takes a step out of line. In these pictures the guy is very guilty ... and his guilt gets him in deeper and deeper. Because he's guilty he pays a terrible price, but we feel better because he paid that price and he ends up with a strict moral code he didn't have at the start of the picture."

When Rob Lowe originally read the script, he says "my strongest reaction on a visceral level was to Alex. But I was nervous about playing him because I felt the character didn't go through any sort of arc or metamorphosis. He ended up unredeemed, unlike the villain I'd played in Masquerade." So Lowe decided to play Michael, the protagonist. He then had second thoughts and was persuaded by Koepp to play Alex.

During rehearsals, a story broke about Lowe filming himself having sex with two women, one of whom was sixteen. "I don't believe in the theory that any publicity is good," said Hanson. "For Rob's sake and the picture's sake, I wish it had never happened. The story broke shortly before rehearsals and my reaction was completely selfish. I kept wondering, 'How does this affect the movie? How does it affect his performance?' It was like a carnival atmosphere around him." It was ultimately decided to keep Lowe in the part.

Filming started 20 June 1989. James Spader called it "an extremely strange, peculiar thriller, and where you end up is extremely surprising. You really think you know where you're going all the way along, and boy, you're surprised just how lost you are."

Reception
Bad Influence received mixed to positive reviews from critics. It holds a 65% rating on Rotten Tomatoes based on 20 reviews.

Roger Ebert gave the film 3 stars out of 4, praising the script and the actors' performances.

Movie historian Leonard Maltin gave the film 2.5 out of a possible 4 stars, saying, "This quasi-remake of Strangers on a Train knows what buttons to push and when; Lowe is convincingly creepy, but he won't make you forget Robert Walker."

Rob Lowe said in a 2017 interview it was the project in his career he did not feel got the attention it deserved. "It was really ahead of its time," he said. "I’m really proud of it... It’s sexy. It’s weird. It’s dark. The characters are great... It’s also a great snapshot of underground L.A. at the beginning of the ’90s. And yet it doesn’t feel dated."

Curtis Hanson said he was "very fond" of the film but "it was an unhappy experience when that picture got released, because it coincided with that ridiculous Rob Lowe videotape scandal. Rob, who I thought was really good in the movie, had his performance overshadowed by this sort of tabloid approach to him and the movie... There were people who actually wrote in reviews that this picture had been put out to capitalize on the scandal. Which, of course, would have been impossible."

See also
 List of American films of 1990
List of films featuring home invasions

References

External links
 
 
Review at Variety
 Bad Influence at the Disobiki
 
 
 Essays about the film at Film of the Month Club

1990 films
1990s psychological thriller films
American neo-noir films
1990s English-language films
Films directed by Curtis Hanson
Films set in Los Angeles
Films with screenplays by David Koepp
Films scored by Trevor Jones
1990s American films